Eragrostis infecunda , commonly known as southern canegrass, is a species of grass, in the subfamily Chloridoideae of the family Poaceae, that is endemic to Australia. It has erect, wiry culms growing to 70 cm in height It is typically found on cracking clay or alluvial sandy loam soils, on floodplains, watercourses and depressions subject to periodic inundation, as well as the margins of marshes and on levees.

References

infecunda
Poales of Australia
Flora of the Northern Territory
Flora of South Australia
Flora of Victoria (Australia)
Plants described in 1931
Taxa named by John McConnell Black